The Latin brocard aut simul stabunt aut simul cadent (or simul simul for short), meaning they will either stand together, or fall together, is used in law to express those cases in which the end of a certain situation automatically brings upon the end of another one, and vice versa.

The first use of this expression in the mass media, which made it known to the non-specialists, was in occasion of one of the first crises between fascist Italy and the Vatican concerning the Concordat. Pope Pius XI is believed to have pronounced the sentence to express the fact that challenging the Concordat would have swept away the whole Lateran treaty, reopening the Roman question.

Constitutional law 
In contemporary constitutional law, especially in the regions and municipalities of Italy, this expression is often used to refer to a mechanism where the resignation or the death of the head of government causes the dissolution of the legislature. This includes the case of the approval of a motion of no confidence, whereby the legislature can only dismiss the head of government at the price of its own dissolution.

The simul-simul provision is typical of semi-parliamentary systems and contrasts with the cohabitational mechanism of semi-presidential republics.

Variants and abbreviations 
simul stabunt aut simul cadent
simul stabunt vel simul cadent
simul stabunt, simul cadent
simul simul

Politics of Italy